The Varsity Match is an annual rugby union fixture played between the universities of Oxford and Cambridge in England. The event began in 1872 with the first men's match, with interruptions only for the two World Wars. Since 1921, the game has been played at Twickenham Stadium, London. It is normally played in early December.

Following the 140th match in 2022, Oxford have 62 wins, and Cambridge maintain the lead with 64; 14 games have ended in draws. Varsity matches between Oxford and Cambridge are also arranged in various other sports. For example, the first recorded water polo match in history was played between Oxford and Cambridge in 1891.

The women's rugby Varsity Match was first played in 1988 and has taken place at Twickenham on the same day as the men's game since 2015. Cambridge won the 2019 match, repeating their 8–5 victory of 2018.

History 
The history of The Varsity Match extends back to early 1872. It was a year after the first ever rugby international (Scotland v England). Both Cambridge and Oxford sent officials to meet and arrange a match between each other. At The Parks, Oxford, they played a 20 a-side version of the game (as opposed to today's 15 a-side games; the teams would be set to 15 a-side in 1875). Oxford won the inaugural meeting. In that first match, Oxford wore dark blue jerseys (the same as today, though at some stages they wore white), however, Cambridge played in pink, changing to their blue and white in 1876.

The second Varsity Match in 1873 was played at Parker's Piece in Cambridge, but since then it has always been played in London. The Oval in Kennington staged seven matches, three games were played at Richardson's Field in Blackheath and another Blackheath venue, Rectory Field, hosted four games before Queen's Club in Kensington became the regular venue from 1887 to 1920. The 1878 and 1879 matches were postponed due to fog.

In 1919, the players were apparently invisible due to fog. In 1921 the match was moved to the Rugby Football Union's famous home ground, Twickenham. The official Varsity Match was not played during wartime although a series of matches were played during the Second World War, resulting in nine wins for Cambridge, two wins for Oxford and one draw. All these games were played either at Oxford or Cambridge. The hundredth match in 1981 was played at Twickenham with a three to four-inch layer of snow covering the pitch; it had snowed overnight and the snow could not be removed in time for the game. 

In 2013 Oxford's Sam Egerton was sent off for an off-the-ball incident and became the first player to be dismissed in the history of the match. Oxford's 43–6 win in 2014 was the biggest victory in the history of the fixture and gave them a fifth successive victory for the first time ever. Cambridge have recorded five wins in a row on three separate occasions, 1972–76, 1980–84 and 1994–98. Oxford's win in the 2015 match was their sixth successive win in the fixture, a record for either side.

In 2021, the event was rebranded as The Varsity Matches in order to reflect the continued integration of the women's fixture.

Due to the COVID-19 pandemic, the 139th match was postponed to March 2021. It was then further postponed to 4 July 2021 and relocated to Welford Road Stadium, Leicester.  The 140th match was played in April 2022 at Twickenham.

Referees

There was not a referee until the 1881 match, when Mr H. H. Taylor officiated.  Prior to this each game had two umpires, one from each university. The record number of appearances is held by former RFU secretary Rowland Hill along with Welshman Gwynne Walters both with seven games. Other notable International referees who have controlled this fixture are Englishmen G. H. Harnett (6) Cyril Gadney (6) and H.L. Ashmore (5), along with Welshmen Albert Freethy (6) and Clive Norling (5).  Up until the start of the professional era, one of the unique aspects of the Varsity game was that the referee was not appointed by the RFU but agreed upon and invited by the two captains. This tradition ended after the 1997–98 season, along with that of the previous year's captains returning to act as touch judges (a continuation of the original custom of each university appointing an umpire), when the RFU Referees' committee decided that touch judges could only be qualified officials and that the RFU should appoint the referee. Now there is also a television match official.

Sponsors

In 2001 the MMC Trophy replaced the Bowring Bowl, established in 1976, as the prize.
2005 was the last year Marsh & McLennan Companies (MMC) sponsored the match.
Subsequent sponsors have been Lehman Brothers from 2006 to 2007, Nomura Group from 2008 to 2011 and Pol Roger and Glenfarclas distillery since 2012. The clothing manufacturer Jack Wills sponsored the clothing until 2014 Investment bank Jefferies Group were announced as the title sponsor for The Varsity Matches 2022.

Notable participants

Many of those who have played in the Varsity Match have gone on to win international honours; a number of others played in the Match after earning international honours. These include:

  Paul Ackford (Lock, Cambridge).
  Charlie Amesbury (Fullback, Cambridge).
  Simon Amor (Scrum Half, Cambridge).
  Rob Andrew (Fly Half, Cambridge).
  Stuart Barnes (Fly Half, Oxford).
  Phil de Glanville (Centre, Oxford).
  Huw Davies (Fly half, Cambridge).
  Phil Davies (Centre, Cambridge).
  Mark Denney (Centre, Cambridge).
  Simon Halliday (Centre, Oxford).
  Alastair Hignell (Fullback, Cambridge).
  Damian Hopley (Centre, Cambridge).
  Martin Purdy (Lock, Cambridge).
  Ben Ransom (Fullback, Oxford).
  Marcus Rose (Full back, Cambridge)
  Chris Sheasby (Number 8, Cambridge).
  Oliver Tomaszczyk (Prop, Oxford).
  Victor Ubogu (Prop, Oxford).
  Tony Underwood (Wing, Cambridge).
  Dom Waldouck (Centre, Oxford).
  Ben Woods (Flanker, Cambridge).
  David Humphreys (Fly Half, Oxford).
  Tyrone Howe (Wing, Oxford)
  Mike Gibson (Centre, Cambridge).
  David Quinlan (Centre, Cambridge).
  Joe Ansbro (Centre, Cambridge).
  Simon Danielli (Wing, Oxford).
  Gavin Hastings (Fullback, Cambridge).
  Simon Holmes (Openside flanker, Cambridge).
  Stuart Moffat (Fullback, Cambridge).
  Rob Wainwright (Flanker, Cambridge).
  Gerald Davies (Wing, Cambridge).
  Onllwyn Brace (Fly Half, Oxford).
  Eddie Butler (Number 8, Cambridge).
  Gareth Davies (Fly Half, Oxford).
  Jamie Roberts (Centre, Cambridge).
  Marco Rivaro (Centre, Cambridge).
  Kensuke Iwabuchi (Cambridge).
  Toshiyuki Hayashi (Oxford).
  Thomas Baxter (Fly Half-1958, Flanker-1959, Oxford).
  Roger Davis (Oxford).
  James Horwill (Lock, Cambridge).
  Tom Lawton Snr (Fly Half, Oxford).
  Brendon Nasser (Number 8, Oxford).
  Bill Ross (Hooker, Oxford).
  Ainslie Sheil (Oxford).
  Brian Smith (Fly Half, Oxford).
  Troy Coker (Number 8, Oxford).
  Bob Egerton (Wing, Oxford).
  Joe Roff (Wing, Oxford).
  Dan Vickerman (Lock, Cambridge).
  Ian Williams (Wing, Oxford).
  Chris Laidlaw (Halfback, Oxford).
  David Kirk (Halfback, Oxford).
  Mark Ranby (Centre, Cambridge).
  Anton Oliver (Hooker, Oxford).
  Mark Robinson (Centre, Cambridge).
  Tommy Bedford (Oxford)
  Nick Mallett (Oxford)
  Nick Koster (Flanker, Cambridge)
  Flip van der Merwe (Lock, Cambridge)
  Anton van Zyl (Lock, Oxford).
  Mathew Guinness-King (Centre, Cambridge).
  Gareth Rees (Fly Half, Oxford).
  Kevin Tkachuk (Prop, Oxford).
  Andrew Bibby (Winger, Oxford).
  Stan McKeen (Flanker, Oxford).
  Nate Brakeley (Lock, Cambridge).
  Raymond Burse (Wing, Oxford).
  Gary Hein (Wing, Oxford).
  Don James (Prop, Oxford).
  Will Johnson (Prop, Oxford).
  Ray Lehner (Prop, Oxford).
  Doug Rowe (Scrum Half, Cambridge).
  Adam Russell (Lock, Oxford).
  Kurt Shuman (Fullback, Oxford).

1987 Rugby World Cup winning All Blacks captain David Kirk played in the 1987 and 1988 Varsity Matches after ending his international career to take up a Rhodes Scholarship at Oxford. Brian Smith represented Australia in the 1987 Rugby World Cup and played in the 1988 and captained 1989 Varsity match for Oxford, before continuing his international career with Ireland 1990–1991.

Former Wallaby Joe Roff played in the 2006 and 2007 Varsity Matches for Oxford after retiring from professional rugby, captaining the side in 2007. Five former or current internationals played in the 2008 Varsity Match. The most notable were retired All Black hooker Anton Oliver for Oxford and former Wallaby lock Dan Vickerman for Cambridge, with Oxford also fielding current Canada flanker Stan McKeen and Cambridge fielding former All Black centre Mark Ranby and former USA scrum-half Doug Rowe. Vickerman captained Cambridge in the 2009 Match, in which McKeen and Rowe also played.

For the 2015 match, Wales and British & Irish Lions centre Jamie Roberts played for Cambridge University as he studied for his master's degree in medical science at the university.

Winners 

Results and information available on Varsity Match website

Men's

 1872: Oxford
 1873: Cambridge
 1873: Draw
 1874: Draw
 1875: Oxford
 1876: Cambridge
 1877: Oxford
 1879: Draw
 1880: Cambridge
 1880: Draw
 1881: Oxford
 1882: Oxford
 1883: Oxford
 1884: Oxford
 1885: Cambridge
 1886: Cambridge
 1887: Cambridge
 1888: Cambridge
 1889: Oxford
 1890: Draw
 1891: Cambridge
 1892: Draw
 1893: Oxford
 1894: Draw
 1895: Cambridge
 1896: Oxford
 1897: Oxford
 1898: Cambridge
 1899: Cambridge
 1900: Oxford
 1901: Oxford
 1902: Draw
 1903: Oxford
 1904: Cambridge
 1905: Cambridge
 1906: Oxford
 1907: Oxford
 1908: Draw
 1909: Oxford
 1910: Oxford
 1911: Oxford
 1912: Cambridge
 1913: Cambridge
 1914: Not held
 1915: Not held
 1916: Not held
 1917: Not held
 1918: Not held
 1919: Cambridge
 1920: Oxford
 1921: Oxford
 1922: Cambridge
 1923: Oxford
 1924: Oxford
 1925: Cambridge
 1926: Cambridge
 1927: Cambridge
 1928: Cambridge
 1929: Oxford
 1930: Draw
 1931: Oxford
 1932: Oxford
 1933: Oxford
 1934: Cambridge
 1935: Draw
 1936: Cambridge
 1937: Oxford
 1938: Cambridge
 1939: Not held
 1940: Not held
 1941: Not held
 1942: Not held
 1943: Not held
 1944: Not held
 1945: Cambridge
 1946: Oxford
 1947: Cambridge
 1948: Oxford
 1949: Oxford
 1950: Oxford
 1951: Oxford
 1952: Cambridge
 1953: Draw
 1954: Cambridge
 1955: Oxford
 1956: Cambridge
 1957: Oxford
 1958: Cambridge
 1959: Oxford
 1960: Cambridge
 1961: Cambridge
 1962: Cambridge
 1963: Cambridge
 1964: Oxford
 1965: Draw
 1966: Oxford
 1967: Cambridge
 1968: Cambridge
 1969: Oxford
 1970: Oxford
 1971: Oxford
 1972: Cambridge
 1973: Cambridge
 1974: Cambridge
 1975: Cambridge
 1976: Cambridge
 1977: Oxford
 1978: Cambridge
 1979: Oxford
 1980: Cambridge
 1981: Cambridge
 1982: Cambridge
 1983: Cambridge
 1984: Cambridge
 1985: Oxford
 1986: Oxford
 1987: Cambridge
 1988: Oxford
 1989: Cambridge
 1990: Oxford
 1991: Cambridge
 1992: Cambridge
 1993: Oxford
 1994: Cambridge
 1995: Cambridge
 1996: Cambridge
 1997: Cambridge
 1998: Cambridge
 1999: Oxford
 2000: Oxford
 2001: Oxford
 2002: Cambridge
 2003: Draw
 2004: Oxford
 2005: Cambridge
 2006: Cambridge
 2007: Cambridge
 2008: Oxford
 2009: Cambridge
 2010: Oxford
 2011: Oxford
 2012: Oxford
 2013: Oxford
 2014: Oxford
 2015: Oxford
 2016: Cambridge
 2017: Cambridge
 2018: Oxford
 2019: Cambridge
 2020: Not held
 2021: Oxford
 2022: Oxford

By total wins

Women's

 1988: Cambridge
 1989: Oxford
 1990: Oxford
 1991: Oxford
 1992: Oxford
 1993: Oxford
 1994: Oxford
 1995: Oxford
 1996: Oxford
 1997: Oxford
 1998: Oxford
 1999: Oxford
 2000: Oxford
 2001: Oxford
 2002: Cambridge
 2003: Cambridge
 2004: Oxford
 2005: Cambridge
 2006: Oxford
 2007: Oxford
 2008: Cambridge
 2009: Cambridge
 2010: Cambridge
 2011: Cambridge
 2012: Oxford
 2013: Oxford
 2014: Oxford
 2015: Cambridge (March) & Cambridge (December)
 2016: Oxford
 2017: Cambridge
 2018: Cambridge
 2019: Cambridge
 2020: Not held
 2021: Cambridge
 2022: Match drawn (10-10)

By total wins

See also
 Cambridge University RUFC
 Oxford University RFC
 Rugby union in England
 The Game (Harvard-Yale)
 The Scottish Varsity
 Varsity match
 Oxbridge rivalry
 Welsh Varsity
 Derby Day, a yearly rugby match between the longstanding rivals University of East Anglia and University of Essex

References

External links
 
 CURUFC
 OURFC

Recurring sporting events established in 1872
Cambridge University R.U.F.C.
Oxford University RFC
Rugby union
Rugby union competitions in England
University and college rugby union competitions
1872 establishments in England